Lina Chabane (born 14 April 1997) is a footballer who plays as a midfielder for Division 1 Féminine club FC Fleury 91 and the Algeria national team.

Born in France, Chabane represented both Morocco and Algeria internationally.

Club career
Chabane is a Le Mans FC product. She has played for FC Tremblay En France, Stade Brestois 29, RC Saint-Denis, Montauban FC and Fleury in France.

International career

Algeria 
In 2016, Chabane was called up for the first time to the Algeria national team on the occasion of a preparation course for the CAN qualifiers.

Morocco 
Chabane made her senior debut for Morocco on 10 June 2021 as a substitution in a 3–0 friendly home win over Mali. Her first match as a starter player was four days later against the same opponent.

See also
List of Morocco women's international footballers

References

External links 
 
 

1997 births
Living people
People from Les Lilas
Footballers from Seine-Saint-Denis
French women's footballers
Algerian women's footballers
Moroccan women's footballers
French sportspeople of Algerian descent
French sportspeople of Moroccan descent
Algerian people of Moroccan descent
Moroccan people of Algerian descent
Women's association football midfielders
Le Mans FC players
Stade Brestois 29 players
Montauban FCTG players
FC Fleury 91 (women) players
Division 1 Féminine players
Algeria women's international footballers
Morocco women's international footballers